BUBBLE Comics (Russian: Издательство BUBBLE) is the largest Russian comic book publisher, founded in 2011. It is the only publishing house in Russia that produces original non-franchised comic books. Its early slate consisted of four titles: Demonslayer, Major Grom, Friar, and Red Fury. These were later joined by Exlibrium and Meteora. The original four titles concluded their run in December 2016 at fifty issues each. In January 2017, four new ongoing series were launched in their place: Allies, Demonslayer vol. 2, Igor Grom, and Realmwalkers.

History

BUBBLE magazine
BUBBLE Comics was founded in 2011 by journalist Artyom Gabrelyanov as part of News Media, a company owned by his father, media mogul Aram Gabrelyanov. Initially it published the eponymous BUBBLE magazine with collections of satirical comics, such as Bruce UnMighty, Dick Adequate, HastarbAnime, and Mister Policeman.

The magazine did not gain much popularity and was published for less than a year. Over time, Artyom Gabrelyanov decided that the publishing house should abandon humorous comics in favor of adventure and superhero ones.

Superhero comics
In October 2012, the publisher started releasing four ongoing monthly series: Major Grom, Demonslayer, Friar, and Red Fury. In October 2014, at the very first Comic-Con Russia in Moscow, BUBBLE Comics announced two new series—Exlibrium and Meteora. First issues of each came out the same month.
In the period between December 2013 and February 2014, the first crossover between the BUBBLE Comics lines was published: a joint story arc of Friar and Demonslayer was released under the title Friar against Demonslayer.

In 2014, two action figures of Red Fury characters were released. In October, BUBBLE Comics became a partner in the first Comic-Con Russia festival.

In October 2015, English-language versions of BUBBLE's comics started appearing on the comiXology platform.

In May 2016, BUBBLE launched a Kickstarter campaign to publish the English-language hardcover edition of Exlibrium. The project was successfully funded, raising $24,554 in total—almost two-and-a-half times more than their initial goal of $10,000.

In December 2016, the publisher announced the closure of its four principal lines (Major Grom, Demonslayer, Friar, Red Fury) and the opening of four new ones—Igor Grom, Demonslayer vol.2, Realmwalkers, and Allies. Each of the old stories ended in the fiftieth issue. The first issues of the new lines went on sale on 20 January 2017. This initiative was called The Second Wind.

BUBBLE Studios
In October 2015, BUBBLE Comics announced the establishment of a film production department, BUBBLE Studios, responsible for adapting their comics to movies. Vladimir Besedin was named head of the department. Shortly after, BUBBLE Studios began work on its first project, the short film Major Grom, intended as a pilot project before making a full-length film. The trailer for the short was released in October 2016. The film, directed by Vladimir Besedin, premiered on 21 February 2017 on BUBBLE's YouTube channel and by the end of its first day, it had more than 1.7 million views. Soon after, BUBBLE Studios began developing the feature film  Major Grom: Plague Doctor.
The production, based on the bestselling comic Major Grom, was released in April 2021. It was made available on the Netflix streaming platform on 7 July 2021.

Other projects
Bubble Comics has collaborated with the Soyuzmultfilm animation studio. The two companies are working together on several projects, one of which is the animated show Coolix, based on the eponymous series of children's comics about superhero animals, published by Bubble in 2017–2018. Coolix is set to premiere in September 2021. The series is planned in 2D format and intended for children ages 6–8. There will presumably be 26 episodes, each 11 minutes long.

"Soyuzmultfilm always has been an experimental studio, and nowadays we are open to various formats of cooperation that allow us to create bright, relevant projects <...> Interaction with Bubble Comics has posed us a number of interesting tasks that are associated with moving comic book heroes onto screens and vice versa—this is a completely new precedent for Russian animation in general".

Additionally, a series of comics about the characters from the "golden collection" of Soviet cartoons is in production. According to Roman Kotkov, editor-in-chief of Bubble Comics, this project is still at an early stage of development, but the style for future releases is already being selected.

List of comics

Series
 Demonslayer (Бесобой, 2012–2016) – a low fantasy series about a demon hunter in modern Moscow
 Demonslayer vol.2 (2017–2021) – a sequel of Demonslayer
 Major Grom (Майор Гром, 2012–2016) – a detective series in which Russian policeman Igor Grom investigates various crimes, including mystical ones. The adventures of Igor Grom continue in the following comics:
 Igor Grom (Игорь Гром, 2017–2021) – a sequel of Major Grom
 Major Igor Grom (Майор Игорь Гром, 2021–present) – a sequel of Igor Grom
 Friar (Инок, 2012–2016) – a time travel fantasy based on Russian history and Orthodox Christianity
 Realmwalkers (Мироходцы, 2017–2018) – a sequel of Friar
 Red Fury (Красная Фурия, 2012–2016) – a story about spy super agents
 Allies (Союзники, 2017–2020) – a sequel of the Red Fury series
 Meteora (Метеора, 2014–present) – a space opera series about cosmic smugglers
 Exlibrium (Экслибриум, 2014–present) – a low fantasy series about a secret order of magicians who protect Earth from fictional characters who become real
 Coolix (Крутиксы, 2017–2018) – comic series for children about superhero animals
 Plague Doctor (Чумной Доктор, 2020–present) – a series about two antagonists from Major Grom
 MIR (МИР, 2020–present) – a comic following a Soviet superhero who died during the Cold war and was resurrected in the present day

Miniseries
 Time of the Raven (Время Ворона, 2015–2016) – a crossover about the characters from Major Grom, Demonslayer, Red Fury, and Friar
 Witch-Hunt (Охота на ведьм, 2018) – a comic following Time of a Raven

Adaptations
 Major Grom (2017) – short film
 Major Grom: Paper Airplanes (2017) – teaser trailer
 Major Grom: Plague Doctor (2021) – feature-length film, part of Bubble Cinematic Universe
 Coolix (2021) – animated series
 Fury (2022) – television series, part of Bubble Cinematic Universe
 Grom: Boyhood (2023) – prequel to Major Grom: Plague Doctor. Part of Bubble Cinematic Universe.

See also
 List of Russian superheroes

References

External links

 

 
Publishing companies of Russia
Russian comics
Companies established in 2011
Publishing companies established in 2011
Book publishing companies based in Moscow
Comics publishing companies
Comic book publishing companies of Russia